Ruckley and Langley is a civil parish in Shropshire, England. It is centred on the hamlets of Ruckley and Langley. The population at the 2011 census can be found under Frodesley.

It is situated south of Acton Burnell and west of Kenley.

Langley Chapel, in Langley, is a small church, built in 1601, and now owned by English Heritage.

References

Civil parishes in Shropshire
Villages in Shropshire